The disappearance of Charles Bothuell V was a controversial case of an American child in Detroit who disappeared and was found imprisoned in the basement of his family home in 2014. His father, Charles Bothuell IV, and stepmother, Monique Dillard-Bothuell, were charged with torture and child abuse. In 2016, Bothuell IV pleaded guilty to fourth-degree child abuse after accepting a plea deal.

History
In early 2014, Bothuell IV and Dillard-Bothuell reported their son, Bothuell V, missing. Eleven days after they filed the missing person report, Bothuell V was found in the family's basement, behind boxes. Bothuell IV learned of the discovery of his son on live television while being interviewed by Nancy Grace, which became a viral video on YouTube.

In April 2015, the couple were arrested and charged with torture and second-degree child abuse. The torture charge, which, if proven, could have resulted in life sentences, was later dismissed by the court.

Trial and aftermath
On January 19, 2016, the case was resolved when Bothuell IV pleaded guilty to fourth-degree child abuse in exchange for removal of the second-degree child-abuse charges. 

Prosecutors revealed that Bothuell V was very thin and had marks on his body from the abuse when he was found after being reported missing. Bothuell V testified that he was kept home from school and forced to engage in rigorous exercise routines daily by his parents, in addition to his allegations of being beaten. 

Bothuell IV also admitted to beating his son with a PVC pipe. He was sentenced to 18 months of probation and mandatory anger management classes. He also lost custody of his son, and was ordered to have no further contact with him. 

Dillard-Bothuell reportedly accepted a plea deal earlier as well, but the details of this plea were not made public. It was also reported that her record would be cleared after six months if she stayed out of legal trouble.

See also 
List of solved missing person cases

References

2014 in Detroit
2010s missing person cases
2014 crimes in the United States
Formerly missing people
Living people
Missing person cases in Michigan
People from Detroit
Year of birth missing (living people)